Zollikon is a railway station in Switzerland, situated near to the banks of Lake Zurich in the municipality of Zollikon. The station is on the Lake Zurich right bank railway line.

The station is served by the following passenger trains:

References

External links 

Railway stations in the canton of Zürich
Swiss Federal Railways stations